Rhopalosoma is a genus of wasps in family Rhopalosomatidae. Members of this family are parasitic of crickets.

Taxonomy
The genus contains the following species:
Rhopalosoma alvarengai Townes, 1977 
Rhopalosoma angulare Townes, 1977 
Rhopalosoma bahianum Schulz, 1906 
Rhopalosoma bolivianum Brues, 1943 
Rhopalosoma breelandi Townes, 1977 
Rhopalosoma guianense Schulz, 1906 
Rhopalosoma haitiense Townes, 1977 
Rhopalosoma hispaniola Lohrmann, 2019 
Rhopalosoma impar Townes, 1977 
Rhopalosoma isopus Townes, 1977 
Rhopalosoma lanceolatum Townes, 1977 
Rhopalosoma minus Townes, 1977 
Rhopalosoma missionicum Ogloblin, 1951 
Rhopalosoma nearcticum Brues, 1943 
Rhopalosoma obliquum Townes, 1977 
Rhopalosoma poeyi Cresson, 1865 
Rhopalosoma scaposum Townes, 1977 
Rhopalosoma simile Brues, 1943

References

Rhopalosomatidae
Hymenoptera genera
Taxa named by Ezra Townsend Cresson